Victor is an unincorporated community in Roberts County, in the U.S. state of South Dakota.

History
Victor was laid out in 1913, and named after Victor Township, in which it is located. A post office called Victor was established in 1913, and remained in operation until 1955.

References

Unincorporated communities in Roberts County, South Dakota
Unincorporated communities in South Dakota